Dichograptidae is an extinct family of graptolites. Fossils are found mostly from the Late Ordovician to the Early Devonian.

Genera
List of genera from Maletz (2014):

†Anthograptus Törnquist, 1904
†Calamograptus Clark, 1924
†Clonograpsus Nicholson, 1873
†Ctenograptus Nicholson, 1876
†Dichograpsus Salter, 1863
†Hermannograptus Monsen, 1937
†Holograptus Holm, 1881a
†Kellamograptus Rickards & Chapman, 1991
†Kstaugraptus Tzaj, 1973
†Loganograptus Hall, 1868
†Mimograptus Harris & Thomas, 1940
†Orthodichograptus Thomas, 1972
†Rouvilligraptus Barrois, 1893
†Schizograptus Nicholson, 1876
†Temnograptus Nicholson, 1876
†Triaenograptus Hall, 1914
†Tridensigraptus Zhao, 1964
†Trochograptus Holm, 1881a

References

Graptolites
Prehistoric hemichordate families